Interserie is the name of a European-based motorsport series started in 1970 that allows for a wide variety of racing cars from various eras and series to compete with less limited rules than in other series.

Created in 1970 by German Gerhard Härle, it is inspired by English races of the 1960s for Group 7 machinery and by the Nordic Challenge Cup which had run in 1969 in Finland and Sweden. Initially using the Group 7 formula similar to that used by Can-Am in North America, the series would evolve to include open-wheel cars with sports-car style full bodywork from CART, Formula One, Formula 3000, Formula 3 and various other series, as well as Group C sports cars.

Although the teams are not as limitless in their modifications or powerplants, the series continues to run today, mostly with various open-wheel cars without full bodywork that became obsolete in current championship series.

Starting from 1999, the Interserie lost its international status and became a Central European championship with sprint races organised by the Automobilclub von Deutschland, mostly for modified formula cars.

Champions

Bibliography

 Christian Naviaux : Intersérie, "les Big Bangers" ou la Can-Am européenne, 1970–1975. Éditions du Palmier, Nîmes, 2012 (in French). .

External links
 Interserie - Official website
 World Sports Racing Prototypes - Interserie history and results

Sports car racing series